Edith Roberts may refer to:

 Edith Roberts (actress), American silent film actress
 Edith A. Roberts, American botanist
 Edith Roberts (writer)